Udayagiriya Vidyalaya is an ancient school about 7 miles from Ampara in Sri Lanka.

External links
 Official web site (in Sinhalese)

Provincial schools in Sri Lanka